The Spirit Valley neighborhood and business district is located within the West Duluth district of Duluth, Minnesota, United States.

Many stores and businesses in the neighborhood are concentrated along Grand Avenue, Central Avenue, Ramsey Street, and Bristol Street.

The Spirit Valley business district is easily accessible from Interstate Highway 35 at Central Avenue.

The Spirit Valley neighborhood, according to the city's official map, follows Grand Avenue between 46th Avenue West and 59th Avenue West; and includes the entire area between Grand Avenue and Mike Colalillo Drive.

Spirit Valley Days
The Spirit Valley Days festival takes place every August.

Events include:

Adjacent neighborhoods

(Directions following those of Duluth's general street grid system, not actual geographical coordinates)

Cody (north, west)
Denfeld (north, east)
Oneota (east)
Irving (south)

External links and references
City of Duluth website
City map of neighborhoods (PDF)
Spirit Valley Days festival – August – website

See also
Interstate Highway 35

Duluth–Superior metropolitan area
Neighborhoods in Duluth, Minnesota